James Cerretani and Adil Shamasdin won in the final 6–3, 2–6, [11–9] against Dustin Brown and Alessandro Motti.

Seeds
The 1st-seeded pair received a bye into the second round.

Draw

Draw

References
 Main Draw

Canella Challenger - Doubles